The Ragadiini are a small tribe of the Satyrinae in the Nymphalidae (brush-footed butterfly) family. This group contains three genera.

Genera
Acrophtalmia
Acropolis
Ragadia

References

 
Satyrinae
Butterfly tribes